The football (soccer) Campeonato Brasileiro Série B 1989, the second level of Brazilian National League, was played from September 9 to December 20, 1989. The competition had 96 clubs and two of them were promoted to Série A. The competition was won by Bragantino.

Championship

First phase

Group A

Group B

Group C

Group D

Group E

Group F

Group G

Group H

Group I

Group J

Group L

Group M

Group N

Group O

Group P

Group Q

Second phase

|}

Third phase

|}

Quarterfinals

|}

Semifinals

|}

Finals

|}

Bragantino wins by 3–1 on aggregate

References

Campeonato Brasileiro Série B seasons
1989 in Brazilian football leagues